John Charles James  was Archdeacon of the Seychelles.

James was educated at Keble College, Oxford and Lincoln Theological College; and ordained in 1971. His first post was a curacy in South Shields. He was Priest in charge at St Mary, Jarrow before his time as Archdeacon; and Vicar of Mylor, Cornwall with Flushing.

References

Living people
20th-century Anglican priests
21st-century Anglican priests
Alumni of Keble College, Oxford
Archdeacons of the Seychelles
Year of birth missing (living people)